Venan (also Romanized as Venān and Vanān) is a village in Qahan Rural District, Khalajastan District, Qom County, Qom Province, Iran. At the 2006 census, its population was 192, in 66 families.

References 

Populated places in Qom Province